Acrochaetiales is an order of red algae.

Taxonomy
Acrochaetiales contains two families and six genera:
Acrochaetiaceae Fritsch ex W.R.Taylor

Acrochaetium Nägeli (synonyms: Chromastrum Papenfuss, Kylinia Rosenvinge, Liagorophila Yamada, Rhodochortonopsis Yamada)

Audouinella Bory
Grania (Rosenvinge) Kylin
Rhodochorton Nägeli (synonym: Thamnidium Thuret)
Rhododrewia S.L.Clayden & G.W.Saunders
Ottiaceae Entwisle, J.R.Evans, M.L.Vis & G.W.Saunders
Ottia Entwisle, J.R.Evans, M.L.Vis & G.W.Saunders

References

 

 
Red algae orders